The Journal of Place Management and Development is a quarterly, peer-reviewed, academic journal covering place branding. It is published by Emerald Publishing and indexed by Scopus.

References

Marketing journals